Johnny Sibilly (born September 5, 1987) is an American actor and producer. His work includes roles in Pose, The Deuce, Hacks and the Queer as Folk reboot on Peacock.

Early life
Sibilly grew up in a military family and lived in Germany, Texas, and Miami. From a young age, he knew he wanted to be an actor.

Career
In 2018, Sibilly began a recurring role in the FX drama Pose. He auditioned for the show three times before being cast.

In December 2020, Sibilly began hosting a twice-weekly series for Logo TV called Logo Live, a rundown of the day's top stories featuring celebrity guests. In February 2021, he was announced as a recurring guest star on the HBO show Hacks. In September 2021, Sibilly was announced as one of five cast members of a new Queer as Folk reboot on Peacock, in which he will play "a successful lawyer who is not as put together as he seems."

Personal life
Sibilly is a queer man, activist, and supporter of Latin-American and LGBTQ+ rights. He is of Cuban and Dominican descent.

Filmography

Film

Television

References

External links

Living people
Queer actors
American film producers
American people of Cuban descent
American people of Dominican Republic descent
People from Miami
LGBT Hispanic and Latino American people
1987 births
Hispanic and Latino American actors